Frank and Ernest is the name of an international religious broadcast by the Dawn Bible Students Association, which has been heard on many stations, including Radio Luxembourg. The program's format was generally that of a personal dialogue, wherein "Frank" asked "Ernest" a question (or vice versa), and a reply is given in order to expound upon the Bible.

In 1928 Norman Woodworth, following intense personal disagreement with the new policies and practices of the Watch Tower Bible and Tract Society, left to create the radio program Frank and Ernest with the help of the Brooklyn, New York Congregation of Bible Students.  He had previously been responsible for producing the same radio program for the Society.

The Dawn Bible Students Association was formed as a printing house by bible students who had left their association with the Watch Tower Society.

External links
  Dawn Bible Students
  Pastor-Russell.com

Christian radio programs
Bible Student movement